DXCC-TV, channel 10, is a television station of Philippine television network Intercontinental Broadcasting Corporation. Its studios are located on Don Apolinar Velez St., Cagayan de Oro.

Areas of coverage
Cagayan de Oro
Misamis Oriental

See also
List of Intercontinental Broadcasting Corporation channels and stations

Television stations in Cagayan de Oro
Intercontinental Broadcasting Corporation stations
Television channels and stations established in 1968